This is a list of major mosques in Japan.

See also 

 Islam in Japan
 Lists of mosques

References

 
Japan
Mosques